The Summerfield School, located off US 271 in Summerfield, Oklahoma, USA, was built in 1937 as a Works Progress Administration project.  It was listed on the National Register of Historic Places in 1988.

It is a single-story hipped-roof four-room  building built of native sandstone.  Its design is from an Oklahoma State Dept. of Education pattern book.

It was deemed significant because its construction provided jobs, for providing a better learning environment for children, and for its architectural uniqueness within its community.

See also
Williams School (Cameron, Oklahoma)

References

School buildings on the National Register of Historic Places in Oklahoma
School buildings completed in 1937
Buildings and structures in Le Flore County, Oklahoma
Works Progress Administration in Oklahoma
National Register of Historic Places in Le Flore County, Oklahoma